Atypoides is a genus of North American folding trapdoor spiders. It was first described by Octavius Pickard-Cambridge in 1883, and it has only been found in United States. It was synonymized with the genus Antrodiaetus in 2007, but was restored to its former independent status in 2019. , it contains only three species: A. gertschi, A. hadros, and A. riversi.

See also
 List of Antrodiaetidae species

References

Further reading

Antrodiaetidae
Mygalomorphae genera
Taxa named by Octavius Pickard-Cambridge
Spiders of the United States